Olen Steinhauer (born June 21, 1970 in Baltimore) is an American writer of spy fiction novels, including The Tourist, part of the Milo Weaver series, and the Yalta Boulevard Sequence.  Steinhauer also created the TV series Berlin Station, focused on a fictional Central Intelligence Agency branch operating in Berlin, which began airing in 2016.

Early life 
On June 21, 1970, Steinhauer was born in Baltimore, Maryland, United States. Steinhauer grew up in Virginia.

Education 
Steinhauer attended university at Lock Haven University of Pennsylvania, and the University of Texas, Austin. He received an MFA in creative writing at Emerson College in Boston.

Career
After graduation, Steinhauer received a year-long Fulbright grant to write a novel in Romania about the Romanian Revolution. It was called Tzara's Monocle, and when he moved to New York City afterward, he used that manuscript to secure a literary agent. However, it was with another book, the historical mystery set in Eastern Europe, The Bridge of Sighs, that Steinhauer first found publication.

His 2009 CIA novel, The Tourist, received positive reviews and is being developed for film by Sony Pictures Entertainment for Doug Liman to direct.

During the winter of 2009-10, Steinhauer was the Picador Guest Professor for Literature at the University of Leipzig's Institute for American Studies in Leipzig, Germany.

Work

The Yalta Boulevard Sequence
The Bridge of Sighs was the first in a five-book series of thrillers chronicling the evolution of a fictional Eastern European country situated in the historical location of Ruthenia (now part of Ukraine) during the Cold War, with one book for each decade. Each book also focuses on a different main character.

The Bridge of Sighs (2003) — Emil Brod, 1948 (nominated for five awards)
The Confession (2004) — Ferenc Kolyeszar, 1956
36 Yalta Boulevard (2005) — Brano Sev, 1966–1967.  Also published as The Vienna Assignment
Liberation Movements (2006) — Brano Sev, Katja Drdova, Gavra Noukas, 1968 & 1975 (nominated for the Edgar Award for Best Novel). Also published as The Istanbul Variations
Victory Square (2007) — The final book in the series, dealing with 1989, the end of communism, and the return to the main character of the first book, Emil Brod.

The Milo Weaver Series
The Tourist (2009) — The first in a series of espionage novels focused on a central character, Milo Weaver.
The Nearest Exit (2010)
An American Spy (2012)
The Last Tourist (2020)

Standalone novels
 The Cairo Affair (2014)
 All the Old Knives (2015)
 The Middleman (2018)

Related reading
Robert Lance Snyder, "'Floating Unmoored': The World of 'Tourism' in Olen Steinhauer's Espionage Trilogy," Clues: A Journal of Detection 38.1 (Spring 2020): 9-18.

References

External links 

 
 Contemporary Nomad (edited by Steinhauer)
 Review of An American Spy in The New York Times

21st-century American novelists
American male novelists
American spy fiction writers
American thriller writers
American crime fiction writers
Emerson College alumni
Living people
1970 births
Writers from Baltimore
Novelists from Virginia
Lock Haven University of Pennsylvania alumni
University of Texas at Austin alumni
21st-century American male writers
Novelists from Maryland
Fulbright alumni